The 1939 season was the Hawthorn Football Club's 15th season in the Victorian Football League and 38th overall.

Fixture

Premiership Season

Ladder

References

Hawthorn Football Club seasons